James Roberts (born 1753) was an enslaved American.

Roberts was born on the Eastern shore of Maryland, during a time of slavery. He was enslaved by Francis De Shields, a colonel in Washington's army. Roberts had fought beside De Shields in the American Revolutionary War, and once the seven-year war with Britain ended, worked for Washington in Philadelphia. Roberts went with De Shields as his servant. When De Shields died, Roberts expected to be set free, but instead was sold to William Ward. Roberts was torn away from his family and then sold at an auction in New Orleans to Calvin Smith.

It is not for me to foretell the end of oppression in this country, but one thing is certain, virtue, sobriety, temperance, economy, education and religion, will fit you for any emergency whatever, and are the best qualifications for free men. That their attainment may be your constant pursuit and most earnest endeavr, is the prayer of one now ready to depart.

While he was enslaved by Calvin Smith he experienced traumatic events on the plantation. His cousin was whipped and put in the stocks only to die a week into being on that very homestead. Soon thereafter, General Jackson traveled to Calvin Smith's to enlist 500 slaves to prepare for the Battle of New Orleans. Roberts was one of these 500 men. When the army arrived in New Orleans, Jackson saw the fear in his men's eyes. To get their spirits up he said,

don't be discouraged, take a second look at them; they are but men like yourselves. Courage will overcome your fears and dread.

The triumph of Jackson's battle had cost Roberts a serious wound to his head as well as a missing forefinger. After the battle was over, the promise that Jackson had made to the enslaved men had evaporated into thin air. They marched to the Kentucky tavern to drink as much as the men pleased.

"Never," said he, "suffer negroes to have arms; if you do, they will take the country. Suffer them to have no kind of weapons over ten inches long. Never allow them to have a piece of paper with any writing on it whatever. You must examine your slaves very closely, for the time is coming when the slave will get light; and if ever his mind is enlightened on the subject of freedom, you cannot keep him. One slave bought from the East will ruin a multitude of those raised here. Before a slave of mine should go free, I would put him in a barn and burn him alive. Gentlemen, take me at my word; for if you do not, you will be sorry for it before many years. Never arm another set of colored people. We have fooled them now, but never trust them again; they will not be fooled again with this example before them. If you do, you will repent of it but once."

After the hearts of these men were broken, the only thing Roberts was allowed to do was go back to work for the master he had learned to despise only to return and observe additional abuse to him and others.

In 1856, Roberts contacted President Pierce located in Washington D.C. for an interview about receiving a pension for his merits in the war. Pierce said that Roberts was nothing more than a horse or a sheep and that it would be a disgrace to take a pension that his master was still receiving and give it to Roberts.

Sources
 James Roberts slave narrative

18th-century American slaves
1753 births
19th-century deaths
People from Maryland
Year of death missing
People who wrote slave narratives
People of colonial Maryland